Cubeatz (sometimes stylized as CuBeatz) are a German hip hop production and songwriting duo from Sindelfingen, consisting of twin brothers Kevin and Tim Gomringer. Originally embarking on their careers within German hip hop in the 2010s, they have since expanded and are now best known for their successful collaborations with hip hop artists such as Drake, Future, Gucci Mane, 21 Savage, Lil Uzi Vert, and Travis Scott, among others. Cubeatz have specialized in creating musical samples to be used by other producers in order to produce the final beat.

In 2016, Cubeatz co-produced charting hits such as "Summer Sixteen" by Drake, "That Part" by Schoolboy Q featuring Kanye West, "No Shopping" by French Montana featuring Drake, "No Heart" by 21 Savage and Metro Boomin. In 2017, they produced high charting singles such as "Tunnel Vision" by Kodak Black, "No Frauds" by Nicki Minaj, Drake and Lil Wayne and "MotorSport" by Migos, Nicki Minaj and Cardi B. In 2018, they produced "Sicko Mode" by Travis Scott, which peaked at number 1 on the Billboard Hot 100. They have been nominated multiple times for a Grammy Award, winning once in 2019 for their work on Cardi B's album Invasion of Privacy.

Early life and career 
Kevin and Tim Gomringer were born as twin brothers on 15 March 1991 in Sindelfingen. They grew up in what Kevin described as a "forest village", where, for them, it was "rainy" and "lonely", which led them to build their craft, or, as Kevin says, "fantasy in their minds". Their parents had a radio receiver and a CD player, with various "classic" records by Björk, U2, Michael Jackson, and more, which further helped them as inspiration to start making music. They started making beats with the DAW software Cubase, which led them to making their stage name "Cubeatz". They eventually started putting their beats on YouTube around the time it launched. In 2008, they earned their first record with German rapper Vega, which led them to making beats for the following six years.

In late 2014, a "friend" of them sent a composition of theirs to American record producer Vinylz, which later evolved into the song R.I.C.O., by rapper Meek Mill featuring Canadian rapper Drake in mid-2015, with additional production by American record producer Allen Ritter. Since then, they were able to send their "original samples" off to other major record producers such as Metro Boomin, Cardo, Boi-1da, Murda Beatz, and much more, gaining momentum in the music industry and garnering a lot of high-profile collaborations with Drake, Travis Scott, Future, 21 Savage, and Don Toliver, among others.

Production discography

Awards and nominations

BET Awards 
The BET Awards are awarded annually by BET. Cubeatz has been nominated seven times and won once.

|-
|rowspan="3"|2018
|Black Panther 
|rowspan="2"|Album of the Year
|
|-
|Culture II 
|
|-
|MotorSport 
|Coca-Cola Viewers' Choice Award
|
|-
|rowspan="5"|2019
|Invasion of Privacy 
|rowspan="3"|Album of the Year
|
|-
|Astroworld 
|
|-
|Championships 
|
|-
|rowspan="2"|Sicko Mode 
|Coca-Cola Viewers' Choice Award
|rowspan="2" 
|-
|Best Collaboration
|-
|2022
|Donda 
|Album of the Year
|

Grammy Awards 
The Grammy Awards are awarded annually by The Recording Academy. Cubeatz has been nominated ten times and won once.

|-
|rowspan="3"|2017
|rowspan="2"|Views 
|Album of the Year
|
|-
|rowspan="2"|Best Rap Album
|
|-
|Blank Face LP 
|
|-
|rowspan="4"|2019
|rowspan="2"|Sicko Mode 
|Best Rap Performance
|rowspan="2" 
|-
|Best Rap Song
|-
|Invasion of Privacy 
|rowspan="2"|Best Rap Album
|
|-
|Astroworld 
|
|-
|rowspan="4"|2020
|Clout 
|Best Rap Performance
|
|-
|I Am > I Was 
|rowspan="3"|Best Rap Album
|
|-
|Revenge of the Dreamers III 
|
|-
|Championships 
|
|-
|rowspan="4"|2022
|rowspan="2"|Donda 
|Album of the Year
|rowspan="2" 
|-
|Best Rap Album

Notes

References 

German record producers
Sony Music Publishing artists
German musical duos
Record production duos
Hip hop duos
Twin musical duos
German twins
Male musical duos
Family musical groups
Hip hop record producers